Silas A. Wade (September 4, 1797February 19, 1869) was a Michigan politician.

Early life
Wade was born on September 4, 1797 in Morristown, New Jersey. In 1835, Wade moved to Rome, Michigan. In 1850, Wade moved to Jefferson Township, Michigan.

Career
Wade was a millwright and a miller. On November 4, 1856, Wade was elected to the Michigan House of Representatives where he represented the Hillsdale County 3rd district from January 7, 1857 to December 31, 1858. In 1857, Wade served as overseer of the poor for Jefferson Township. After his time in the legislature, Wade continued to serve in the Jefferson Township local government. In 1859, Wade served as justice of the peace. In 1862, Wade served as township supervisor.

Personal life
On December 30, 1818, Wade married Sally A. Beers. Together, they more than four children. In 1850, Sarah A. Beers died. On February 26, 1851, Wade married Betsey Barker in Hillsdale County.

Death
Wade died on February 19, 1869.

References

1797 births
1869 deaths
American justices of the peace
People from Morristown, New Jersey
People from Hillsdale County, Michigan
Republican Party members of the Michigan House of Representatives
19th-century American judges
19th-century American politicians